AntWeb is the leading online database on ants: storing specimens images and records, and natural history information, and documenting over 490,000 specimens across over 35,000 taxa of ants in its open source and community driven repository . It was set up by Brian L. Fisher in 2002, and cost US$30,000 dollars to build.

References

External links 

 Website

Entomological databases
Myrmecology